Chavela Aaron is a former international competitor for Taekwondo and Karate. She competed in the 1992 US Olympic Trials as well as other competitions.  She earned a silver in the 1991 World Taekwondo Championships in the middleweight division.  Originally from Boston, she has also lived in Jacksonville, Florida.

References

American female karateka
American female taekwondo practitioners
Year of birth missing (living people)
Living people
Sportspeople from Boston
Sportspeople from Jacksonville, Florida
21st-century American women
20th-century American women